Prototroctes modestus is an extinct species of bony fish in the genus Prototroctes. It existed in what is now New Zealand in the early Miocene epoch. It was described by Werner Schwarzhans, R. Paul Scofield, Alan J. D. Tennyson, Jennifer P. Worthy and Trevor H. Worthy in 2012.

References

modestus
Miocene fish
Fish described in 2012
Fossil taxa described in 2012
Prehistoric vertebrates of Oceania
Fish of New Zealand